Third Lake may refer to:

Third Lake (Bisby Lakes, New York)
Third Lake (Fulton County, New York)
Third Lake (Herkimer County, New York), part of the Fulton Chain of Lakes
The Third Lake, Ontario, Canada
Third Lake, Illinois, a village
Third Lake, Nova Scotia, several lakes
Third Lake, third of four lakes in the Nanaimo Lakes chain